Everything to Gain (also known as Barbara Taylor Bradford's Everything to Gain) is a 1996 American made-for-television romantic drama film starring Sean Young and Jack Scalia, directed  by Michael Miller and based on a novel by Barbara Taylor Bradford.

Plot

Cast
 
Sean Young as Mallory Ashton Jordan Keswick 
Jack Scalia as Detective Michael DeMarco
Anne Ramsay as Sarah Kempner
Joanna Miles as Jessica Jordan
Samantha Eggar as Diana Keswick
Charles Shaughnessy as Andrew Keswick
Cedric Smith as Edward Jordan
Jason Cavalier as Alvin Charles
Vik Sahay as Roland Jellico
Don Jordan as Paulie Edwards

References

External links

1996 television films
1996 romantic drama films
1996 films
American romantic drama films
CBS network films
Films based on American novels
American drama television films
Films directed by Michael Miller (director)
1990s English-language films
1990s American films